William Gardiner was a member of the Wisconsin State Assembly.

Biography
Gardiner was born on September 3, 1826, in Gloucestershire, England. In 1860, he married Carrie Dockstader. They would have nine children. Gardiner and much of his family were Congregationalists.

Career
Gardiner was elected to the Assembly in 1878. Additionally, he was Chairman (similar to Mayor) of Bradford, Wisconsin and Chairman of the County Board of Rock County, Wisconsin. He was a Republican.

References

People from Gloucestershire
English emigrants to the United States
19th-century English politicians
19th-century Congregationalists
Politicians from Janesville, Wisconsin
Republican Party members of the Wisconsin State Assembly
Mayors of places in Wisconsin
1826 births
Year of death missing
People from Rock County, Wisconsin